425 California Street is a 26-story high-rise office building on California and Sansome Streets in San Francisco, California. It is the headquarters for Cahill Contractors. It was completed in 1968.

References
 
 

Financial District, San Francisco
Skyscraper office buildings in San Francisco

Office buildings completed in 1968